The 2004 Cherwell District Council election took place on 10 June 2004 to elect members of Cherwell District Council in Oxfordshire, England. One third of the council was up for election and the Conservative Party stayed in overall control of the council.

After the election, the composition of the council was:
Conservative 36
Labour 10
Liberal Democrat 4

Election result

Ward results

References

External links
 Ward results with map

2004 English local elections
2004
2000s in Oxfordshire